Wonkwang Law School is one of the professional graduate schools of Wonkwang University, located in Iksan, South Korea. Founded in 2009, it is one of the founding law schools in South Korea and is one of the smaller schools with each class in the three-year J.D. program having approximately 60 students.

Programs
Wonkwang  Law specializes on the small and medium business law.

References

Website 
 Official Website

Law schools in South Korea
Educational institutions established in 2009
2009 establishments in South Korea